Seoul Metro Corporation was a municipal-owned corporation owned by the Seoul Metropolitan Government. Established in 1970, it was, with Seoul Metropolitan Rapid Transit Corporation and Korail, one of the major operators of Seoul Metropolitan Subway. The company merged with Seoul Metropolitan Rapid Transit Corporation in 2017.

History
 June 8, 1970: Subway construction headquarters
 April 1971: Line 1 (Cheongnyangni Station - Seoul Station) construction started and opened
 October 1974: Gunja Depot construction
 March 9, 1978: Line 2 Gangnam Section construction started
 February 29, 1980: Line 3 and 4 construction started
 May 22, 1984: Line 2 Circle Line opened
 October 18, 1985: Line 3 and 4 opened
 July 13, 1990: Line 3 (Gupabal Station - Jichuk Station) opened
 May 22, 1992: Line 2 Sinjeong Branch (Sindorim Station - Yangcheon-gu Office Station) opened
 April 21, 1993: Line 4 (Sanggye Station - Danggogae Station) opened
 October 10, 1993: Line 3 (Yangjae Station - Suseo Station) opened
 April 1, 1994: Line 4 (Sadang Station - Namtaeryeong Station) opened
 March 20, 1996, Line 2 Sinjeong Branch (Sinjeongnegeori Station - Kkachisan Station) opened
 October 20, 2005: Line 2 Yongdu Station opened
 December 21, 2005: Line 1 Dongmyo Station opened
 February 18, 2010: Line 3 (Suseo Station - Ogeum Station) opened
 March 28, 2015: Line 9 (Eonju Station - Sports Complex Station) opened
 May 31, 2017: Merged with Seoul Metropolitan Rapid Transit Corporation & Seoul Metro

Lines
Seoul Metro's service covers a part of Seoul Subway Line 1, and the whole Seoul Subway Line 2, Seoul Subway Line 3, Seoul Subway Line 4.  For lines 1, 3, and 4, Korail jointly participates in the service.  Seoul Metro controls the railways and stations which are owned by Seoul Metropolitan Government.

 Line 1
 Control: Cheongnyangni station - Seoul Station
 Service: Yangju station - Incheon station / Seodongtan station
 Total Length: 7.8 km
 Line 2
 Circle Line: City Hall station ↔ Seongsu station ↔ Gangnam station ↔ Sindorim station ↔ Hongik University station ↔ City Hall station
 Seongsu Branch
 Sinjeong Branch (Except for Kkachisan station controlled by Seoul Metropolitan Rapid Transit Corporation)
 Total Length: 60.2 km
 Line 3
 Control: Jichuk station - Ogeum station (Except for Garak Market station controlled by Seoul Metropolitan Rapid Transit Corporation)
 Service: Daehwa station - Ogeum station
 Total Length: 38.2 km
 Line 4
 Control: Danggogae station - Namtaeryeong station
 Service: Danggogae station - Oido station
 Total Length: 31.7 km
 Line 5
 Control: Ogeum station
 Line 6
 Control: Yeonsinnae station
 Line 9
 Control: Eonju station - Sports Complex station
 Total Length: 4.3 km

Depots
 Gunja Depot
 Sinjeong Depot
 Jichuk Depot
 Changdong Depot

See also 
 Korail
 Seoul Metropolitan Rapid Transit Corporation
 List of rapid transit systems
 List of urban rail systems by length
 Seoul Metropolitan Subway stations
 Transportation in South Korea

References

External links 

 Official Website of Seoul Metro
 Seoul Metropolitan City Government

Seoul Metropolitan Subway
Railway companies of South Korea
Transport operators of South Korea
Railway companies established in 1970
2017 mergers and acquisitions
Companies based in Seoul
South Korean companies established in 1970